Mr. Perfect is a 2011 Indian Telugu-language romantic comedy film directed by Dasaradh, and produced by Dil Raju. The film stars Prabhas, Kajal Agarwal and Taapsee Pannu while Murali Mohan, Prakash Raj, Sayaji Shinde, Nassar, and K. Vishwanath play supporting roles. The film released on 22 April 2011 to positive reviews. The film won the newly incorporated Nagi Reddy Memorial Award for "Best Telugu Family" entertainer for the year 2011. The film's title is based on a song from Arya 2.

Plot
Vicky (Prabhas), an expert in gaming software, lives in Australia and never compromises in his life, a principle that he adheres to since his childhood. He believes that one should be oneself in a relationship and one should not change one's characteristics or personality to get along with his/her partner. He also encourages his friends to follow his principle of life, but his principles and attitude lead to a clash of interests with his father (Nassar), who constantly advises him to adjust for his and others' happiness. Unfortunately, Vicky pays no heed.

Meanwhile, in India, Vicky's parents arrange a wedding alliance between him and Priya (Kajal Aggarwal). Priya is Vicky's childhood friend and a doctor by profession. She and Vicky are poles apart; while Vicky is modern in his thinking and is not ready to compromise with his life, Priya is traditional and conservative and is ready to compromise for the happiness of others. Initially, Vicky and Priya do not get along - they both play practical jokes on one another, but later, on her father's (Murali Mohan) advice, Priya attempts to change her attitude towards Vicky and be more positive about him. Soon enough, Priya falls in love with Vicky and changes many of her interests to adjust with him, such as giving up her love of classical dance as Vicky does not like it, eating non-vegetarian food, and wearing modern dresses. Vicky too begins to fall in love with her and is ready to accept the wedding proposal. He receives the news of his friend Shiva's (Sagar) divorce where the relationship soured due to too many compromises. Vicky is very disturbed when he begins to find out that Priya has compromised for his sake. He rejects the proposal and returns to Australia.

Back in Australia, Vicky is matched up through a Cadbury survey (Made for each other), with Maggie (Taapsee), a free-spirited modern girl who shares his no-compromise attitude. Both meet at a mall and, interested in each other, begin to date and soon decide to get married. However, Maggie's father is none other than Dubey (Prakash Raj), the MindGames head's brother. He is unwilling to let Vicky marry Maggie. After much persuasion from Vicky, Dubey agrees to let Vicky marry Maggie on the condition that he should stay in his house for four days for Maggie's sister's wedding and if Vicky manages to win over at least two of Maggie's relatives, he can marry her and he would get a business in India; else, he should forget Maggie and leave the contract. However Vicky insists that if even one relative of Maggie does not get convinced that Vicky is the correct match for Maggie, then he would forget Maggie and leave the contract.

Soon, the relatives begin pouring in from India and among them, to Vicky's shock, is Priya, who happens to be the groom's (Kaushal Manda) cousin. During the four days, with Priya's help, he manages to win over the entire family. It is clear that Vicky is going to win Dubey's challenge. But during the challenge he realises that he has compromised by losing a game to reconcile two brothers, ate sweets, etc. Priya leaves for India on the night before Vicky wins the challenge, heartbroken at the thought of Vicky marrying someone else. Vicky receives a message Priya had recorded prior to him rejecting her on his mobile phone where she had declared her love for him. He has a change of heart and realizes how much Priya had loved him and was willing to change for him, in spite of his faults. He also realizes the need for compromise in life. Vicky conveys his feelings to all the wedding guests present and decides not to marry Maggie. Maggie understands and accepts his decision.

Vicky returns to India to win back Priya. After initially playing hard-to-get, Priya accepts Vicky's love, and they live happily after.

Cast

 Prabhas as Vikram "Vicky"
 Kajal Agarwal as Priya Rao
 Taapsee Pannu as Maggie Dubey
 Murali Mohan as Rao, Priya's father
 Prakash Raj as Dubey, Maggie's father
 Sayaji Shinde as Maggie's uncle
 Nassar as Vicky's father
 K. Vishwanath as Maggie's grandfather
 Tulasi as Vicky's mother
 Pragathi as Maggie's mother
 Bramhanandam as Jalsa Kishore (maternal uncle of Priya)
 Sagar as Shiva
 Y. Kasi Viswanath as Maggie's relative
 Sameer as Maggie's relative
 Sudeepa Pinky as Vicky's sister
 Raghu Babu as Dubey's brother-in-law
 Master Bharath as Priya's brother
 Satyadev as Vicky's friend
 Krishnudu as Krishna, Vicky's friend
 Akhil Karteek as Vicky's friend
 Kaushal Manda as Priya's cousin
 Raja Ravindra as Raja
 Banerjee as Priya's relative
 Prabhas Sreenu
 Rajitha

Reception
Sify mentioned "Director Dasarath should be appreciated for his clean, family-oriented outlook, keeping under check all the elements that are not his forte. The screenplay is slow, but interesting, and remains unpredictable till the end of the film". The Times of India gave a two and a half rating, said that "What is applause-worthy in the movie is Kajal Agarwal's performance. She looks great, expresses well and fits into the role perfectly. Prabhas manages to look nice, but really needs to work on his dialogue delivery."

Soundtrack

The original score was composed by Devi Sri Prasad and the soundtrack for the film was released on 19 March 2011. Shreya Ghoshal won The Hyderabad Times Film Award in 2011 for best playback singing for her track "Chali Chaliga".

Awards and nominations

Release
The film released on 22 April 2011
 The film was released in almost 800 theatres in Andhra pradesh.
 The film also released in Karnataka, the rest of India, and overseas with 200 odd prints.

It was dubbed into Tamil and Malayalam under the same title and later into Hindi under the title No.1 Mr. Perfect (by Goldmines Telefilms in 2013).

Home media
 The satellite rights were obtained by Gemini TV for 4.5 crore.
 The DVD was released by Aditya Videos on 10 September 2011, in NTSC video format for a purchase price of $7.99.
 The Blu-ray Disc was released by Aditya Videos on 20 October 2011, in NTSC video format and 5.1 Dolby Digital Surround audio format for a purchase price of $24.99.

Plagiarism
Novelist Shyamala Rani has approached the court, claiming the storyline of Mr Perfect is based on her novel Naa Manasu Korindi Ninne and many scenes and the overall tone of the film also coincides with her writing. Shyamala Rani also claimed in April 2019 that the court has passed an interim judgement in favour of her.

References

External links
 

2011 films
Films shot in Australia
Films shot in Ooty
Films scored by Devi Sri Prasad
Indian romantic comedy films
2011 romantic comedy films
2010s Telugu-language films
Sri Venkateswara Creations films